The Garden Grove Unified School District (GGUSD) is the 14th-largest school district in California. It includes boundaries in Anaheim, Cypress, Fountain Valley, Garden Grove, Santa Ana, Stanton, and Westminster.

The district includes forty-eight elementary schools, ten intermediate schools, eight high schools, two special education schools, and two continuation schools.

It was formed in July 1965 from the merger of three districts: the Garden Grove Elementary School District (established 1875), the Alamitos School District (1880s) and the Garden Grove Union High School District (1921).

In 2004, the district received the Broad Prize for Urban Education. Twice before, it had been a Broad Prize finalist.

In 2016, the district received 1st in Mathematics for the statewide SBAC, and 2nd in ELA behind San Francisco.

In 2017, the GGUSD Board of Education announced that it would launch its Vietnamese dual immersion program the following year at John Murdy Elementary School, becoming the fourth school district in the United States to do so.

The district superintendent is Dr. Gabriela Mafi.

Career and technical education
 CTE

Adult education
 LEC Adult Education

Special education
 The Adult Transition Program at Jordan
 Special Education Center at Mark Twain

High schools
 Bolsa Grande High School
 Garden Grove High School
 Hare Continuation High School
 La Quinta High School
 Los Amigos High School
 Pacifica High School
 Rancho Alamitos High School
 Santiago High School

Intermediate schools
 Alamitos Intermediate
 Bell Intermediate
 Doig Intermediate
 Fitz Intermediate Computer Science Adcademy
 Irvine Intermediate
 Jordan Intermediate
 Lake Intermediate
 McGarvin Intermediate
 Ralston Intermediate
 Walton Intermediate

Preschool and Elementary schools
 Allen Elementary
 Anthony Elementary
 Barker Elementary
 Brookhurst Elementary
 Bryant Elementary
 Carrillo Elementary
 Carver Early Childhood Education
 Clinton Elementary
 Clinton Corner Family Campus
 Cook Elementary
 Crosby Elementary
 Eisenhower Elementary
 Enders Elementary
 Evans Elementary
 Excelsior Elementary
 Faylane Elementary
 Garden Park Elementary
 Gilbert Elementary
 Hazard Elementary
 Heritage Elementary Computer Science Immersion Academy
  Merton E. Hill Elementary
 Lawrence Elementary
 Marshall Elementary
 Mitchell Elementary
 Monroe Elementary Language Academy
 Morningside Elementary
 Murdy Elementary
 Newhope Elementary
 Northcutt Elementary
 Paine Elementary
 Parkview Elementary
 Patton Elementary
 Peters K-3 Elementary
 Peters 4-6 Elementary
 Post Elementary
 Riverdale Elementary
 Rosita Elementary
 Russell Elementary Language Academy
 Simmons Elementary
 Skylark Preschool
 Stanford Elementary
 Stanley Elementary
 Sunnyside Elementary
 Violette Elementary
 Wakeham Elementary
 Warren Elementary
 Woodbury Elementary
 Zeyen Elementary

References

External links

 

School districts in Orange County, California
Education in Garden Grove, California
School districts established in 1965
1965 establishments in California
Stanton, California